This is a list of flags used in Hungary. For more information about the national flag, visit the article Flag of Hungary.

Current flags

National flags

Governmental flags

Military flags

Army flags

Naval flags

Subdivision flags

Municipal flags

Other flags

Political flags

Organization flags

House flags

Yacht club flags

Ethnic Hungarian minorities' flags

Historical flags

National flags

Governmental flags

Military flags

War flags

Army flags

Naval flags

Subdivision flags

Municipal flags

Other flags

Political flags

Organization flags

House flags

Yacht club flags

Proposed flags

See also
 Flag of Hungary
 Flags of Hungarian history
 Coat of arms of Hungary
 National symbols of Hungary

Flags
Hungary